The 1932 St. Louis Cardinals  season was the team's 51st season in St. Louis, Missouri and its 41st season in the National League. The Cardinals went 72–82 during the season and finished 6th in the National League. This was the first season to feature numbers on the back of the Cardinals' uniforms.

Offseason 
 September 30, 1931: Carey Selph was drafted from the Cardinals by the Chicago White Sox in the 1931 rule 5 draft.

Regular season

Season standings

Record vs. opponents

Roster

Player stats

Batting

Starters by position 
Note: Pos = Position; G = Games played; AB = At bats; H = Hits; Avg. = Batting average; HR = Home runs; RBI = Runs batted in

Other batters 
Note: G = Games played; AB = At bats; H = Hits; Avg. = Batting average; HR = Home runs; RBI = Runs batted in

Pitching

Starting pitchers 
Note: G = Games pitched; IP = Innings pitched; W = Wins; L = Losses; ERA = Earned run average; SO = Strikeouts

Other pitchers 
Note: G = Games pitched; IP = Innings pitched; W = Wins; L = Losses; ERA = Earned run average; SO = Strikeouts

Relief pitchers 
Note: G = Games pitched; W = Wins; L = Losses; SV = Saves; ERA = Earned run average; SO = Strikeouts

Farm system 

LEAGUE CHAMPIONS: Greensboro, SpringfieldIllinois–Indiana–Iowa League folded, July 15; Southeastern League folded, May 21; Cotton States League folded, July 13, 1932

References

External links
1932 St. Louis Cardinals at Baseball Reference
1932 St. Louis Cardinals  at Baseball Almanac

St. Louis Cardinals seasons
Saint Louis Cardinals season
St Louis Cardinals